Vahe "Buck" Kartalian (August 13, 1922 – May 24, 2016) was an American professional wrestler and character actor.

Biography
Vahe Kartalian was born on August 13, 1922, in Detroit, Michigan, the son of Armenian immigrants. He had four sisters and one brother. When Kartalian was two, their family moved to New York City. His father, a baker, died when he was 11. During World War II, Kartalian served in the United States Navy on a destroyer in the Pacific theatre. After returning home, he worked as a body builder and professional wrestler (called the "Hell's Kitchen Roughneck") and competed in both regional and national competitions. Kartalian decided to become an actor after being noticed by Broadway producers. He never took acting lessons.

Plays in which Kartalian appeared on Broadway included One More River (1960), Golden Fleecing (1959), and Romeo and Juliet (1951). In Romeo and Juliet, he played Sampson alongside Olivia de Havilland as Juliet.

Kartalian appeared in more than 70 films and television shows between 1953 and his retirement in 2006. Kartalian is best known for his role in the film Planet of the Apes (1968) as Julius, the brutish gorilla who guarded the captive humans at the Research Complex. He later played the gorilla Frank in the third film of the series, Conquest of the Planet of the Apes (1972). Kartalian is also known for his film roles as a sailor in Mister Roberts (1955), a prisoner in Cool Hand Luke (1967), a shopkeeper in The Outlaw Josey Wales (1976), and a reverend in The Rock (1996).

On television, Kartalian appeared on various shows, including Naked City, The Untouchables, Get Smart, The Munsters, Batman, Lou Grant, Cagney & Lacey, and Friends. Kartalian also had a regular role as Bruce W. Wolf in Monster Squad (1976).

Personal life
On January 9, 1952, Kartalian married Mary Evonne Bannister in the Curran Theatre in San Francisco. The ceremony took place on the set of the play Mr. Roberts, in which Kartalian was appearing. They later divorced. Kartalian married Margaret Poloshjian in 1959. They had three children: Aram, Julie, and Jason. Jason Kartalian became a film producer and director.

Kartalian died on May 24, 2016, in a hospital in Mission Hills, California, at age 93.

Filmography

Film

Television

References

Further reading

External links
 
 

1922 births
2016 deaths
American male film actors
American male stage actors
American male television actors
American people of Armenian descent
United States Navy personnel of World War II
Male actors from Detroit
20th-century American male actors